Mia Jones may refer to:
 Mia Jones (Degrassi: The Next Generation), a character on Degrassi: The Next Generation
 Mia L. Jones (born 1968), Florida politician